Elizaveta Ukolova (born 12 March 1998) is a Czech figure skater. She has won three senior international medals and is a two-time Czech national silver medalist. She competed at the 2014 Winter Olympics and qualified for the free skate.

Personal life 
Born on 12 March 1998 in Kirov, Kirov Oblast, Russia, Elizaveta Ukolova moved with her family to the Czech Republic when she was two years old. She became a Czech citizen in 2012. She has two elder sisters — Mariya, a competitor in ice dancing, and Anna, an operation manager in Landmarktours.

Career

Early years
Ukolova started skating in 2005, having been introduced to the activity by her mother.

She debuted on the ISU Junior Grand Prix (JGP) series in the 2011–2012 season. After winning the Czech national junior title in December 2011, she was named in the Czech team to the 2012 World Junior Championships in Minsk, Belarus. Ranked 24th in the short, she qualified for the free skate, where she placed 20th, lifting her to 22nd overall.

The following season, Ukolova competed in two JGP events and won the junior title at the 2012 NRW Trophy. She was eliminated from the 2013 World Junior Championships in Milan, Italy after placing 33rd in the short program.

2013–2014: Olympic season
Ukolova continued on the JGP series in the 2013–2014 season. She was also assigned to the 2013 Nebelhorn Trophy following a Czech internal competition in August. Nebelhorn was her senior international debut and the final qualifying competition for the 2014 Winter Olympics. As a result of Ukolova's tenth-place finish, the Czech Republic received one of the six remaining spots for countries which had not previously qualified a ladies' entry.

Ukolova won her first senior international medal, bronze, at the 2013 Warsaw Cup. During the season, she trained mainly in Prague and also spent a week per month in Oberstdorf. At the Olympics in Sochi, she qualified for the free skate and finished 22nd overall.

2014–2015 to present
Competing in Tallinn, Estonia at the 2015 World Junior Championships, Ukolova placed 20th in the short, 17th in the free, and 17th overall.

Stepping onto her second senior international podium, she received the bronze medal at the 2015 Merano Cup.

Programs

Competitive highlights 
CS: Challenger Series; JGP: Junior Grand Prix

References

External links 

 

1998 births
Czech female single skaters
Living people
Sportspeople from Kirov, Kirov Oblast
People from Poděbrady
Naturalized citizens of the Czech Republic
Figure skaters at the 2014 Winter Olympics
Olympic figure skaters of the Czech Republic
Russian emigrants to the Czech Republic